Argyresthia lustralis is a moth of the  family Yponomeutidae. It is found in the Seychelles (Mahé and Silhouette islands).

The wingspan is 9–11 mm. The head, palpi and thorax are white, shoulders narrowly brownish. The forewings are brownish strigulated with blackish, with a broad snow-white streak occupying the dorsal half of the wing. Hindwings are grey.

References

Argyresthia
Moths of Africa